Kang Hyo-won (Korean: 강효원; born September 19, 1983), known professionally as Pdogg (Korean: 피독), is a South Korean record producer, composer, and lyricist for Big Hit Music. He has produced and composed for artists such as 8Eight, Baek Ji-young, BTS, Jo Kwon, and Lim Jeong-hee, among others.

Biography and career 

In 2007, at age 25, Pdogg established a relationship with Big Hit Entertainment's CEO Bang Si-hyuk—Bang managed an online composing community where Pdogg uploaded some of his own musical compositions. The music was well received, and Pdogg's tracks "Come Back" and "Love" were included on co-ed group 8Eight's debut studio album, The First, and Lim Jeong-hee's third studio album, Before I Go, J-Lim, respectively—both albums were released that same year. In 2010, with the help of rapper Sleepy, Pdogg discovered a young RM, around whom the formation of boy group BTS later began, and brought him to Big Hit. He eventually became the group's main producer. 

At the Korea Music Copyright Awards held in February 2019, Pdogg was honoured by the Korea Music Copyright Association (KOMCA) and awarded the daesang as the highest-earning songwriter and composer of 2018. He has consecutively won the award every year since then, having earned the most royalties for songwriting and composition out of all Korean composers and lyricists. In November 2020, due to his major contribution to BTS' musical career, an episode of Immortal Songs: Singing the Legend was dedicated to his songs.

Discography

Collaborations

As featured artist

Production discography 

All music credits are adapted from the KOMCA database.

Awards and nominations

References

External links
 

1983 births
Living people
South Korean record producers